Cavia patzelti, commonly known as the Sacha guinea pig, is a species of Cavia native to Ecuador. Little is known about its population.

References

Cavies
Mammals described in 1982